Cui Yuzhong (born November 1964) is a vice admiral (zhongjiang) of the People's Liberation Army (PLA), serving as deputy commander of the People's Liberation Army Navy since June 2021. He is a representative of the 19th National Congress of the Chinese Communist Party and an alternate member of the 19th Central Committee of the Chinese Communist Party.

Biography
Cui was born in Hailun County (Hailun), Heilongjiang, in November 1964. He served in the North Sea Fleet before being appointed assistant chief of staff of the People's Liberation Army Navy in July 2013. In March 2016, he was commissioned as deputy commander of the South Sea Fleet, concurrently serving as commander of its Naval Aviation Force, he remained in that positions until July 2016, when he was transferred to East Sea Fleet and assigned to the similar position. In April 2020, he rose to become deputy chief of staff of the People's Liberation Army Navy, and in December, he was despatched to the Eastern Theater Command as deputy commander. In June 2021, he was reassigned to as the People's Liberation Army Navy as deputy commander.

He was promoted to the rank of rear admiral (Shaojiang) in July 2014 and vice admiral (zhongjiang) in December 2020.

References

1964 births
Living people
People from Hailun
People's Liberation Army generals from Heilongjiang
People's Republic of China politicians from Heilongjiang
Chinese Communist Party politicians from Heilongjiang
Alternate members of the 19th Central Committee of the Chinese Communist Party